Annika Falkengren née Bolin (born 1962) is a Swedish banker, one of Lombard Odier’s seven managing partners. She started her professional career in 1987 at Skandinaviska Enskilda Banken where she ascended through the ranks to become its President and CEO in 2005, a position she occupied until 2017. Over her career, she has held various Board Membership positions and received numerous awards, most notably being repeatedly ranked by Fortune Magazine as one of the most powerful women in Global Business.

Early life and education
Annika Falkengren was born on 12 April 1962 in Bangkok where her parents were stationed as diplomats for the Swedish Ministry of Foreign Affairs. Being born into a diplomatic family, her initial years were characterized by frequent relocations. She returned to Sweden to pursue her studies at the Sigtunaskolan Humanistiska Läroverket Boarding School and following that continued her higher education at Stockholm University from where she graduated in 1987 with a bachelor’s degree in Business Administration and Economics.

Career
Falkengren joined SEB in 1987 directly out of university as part of the Banks’ graduate training program. This was the first stepping stone in a long career with SEB that would see her hold various senior positions and responsibilities spanning over 30 years and culminating in her assuming the helm of the Bank in 2005 as the President and CEO of SEB, a position she held until July 2017. Along the way she headed Fixed Income Trading and Sales, Trading & Capital Markets Division; and Corporate & Institutional Division, before being nominated on 10 November 2005 by the Board of SEB to succeed Lars H. Thunell as he left for the World Bank.

In August 2017, Annika Falkengren joined Lombard Odier as Managing Partner. Amongst her responsibilities today is Group Corporate Sustainability which she co-chairs with the Group's Senior Managing Partner, Patrick Odier, as well as risk, marketing and communications.

Annika Falkengren has served on the boards and supervisory boards of, amongst others, Securitas, Munich RE, Scania, and Volkswagen. She also served as board member and then chair of the Swedish Bankers’ Association. She currently is a member of the Royal Swedish Academy of Engineering Sciences and sits on the board of the Mentor and IMD Foundations.

She is an avowed opponent of women's quotas and instead advises women who aspire to board careers to avoid departments such as human resources and communications.

Recognition
Swedish business magazine Veckans Affärer named her one of the most powerful woman in Swedish business in 2005 and 2013.  The Financial News Online has ranked her in 2006 as No 68 amongst the "100 most influential people in European capital markets". In 2012, the Euro Finance Group awarded Annika Falkengren with the European Banker of the Year award. Fortune has repeatedly ranked her among the 10 most powerful women in global business, being the third most powerful woman in Europe, the Middle East and Africa in 2015.

References

External links

 Fortune Magazines - Top 10 Most Powerful Women Globally

20th-century Swedish businesswomen
20th-century Swedish businesspeople
Stockholm University alumni
Living people
1962 births
21st-century Swedish businesswomen
21st-century Swedish businesspeople